Aasen is a Norwegian surname. Notable people with the surname include:

Arne Paasche Aasen (1901–1978), Norwegian politician, journalist and poet
Augusta Aasen (1878–1920), Norwegian politician
Elisabeth Aasen (1922–2009), Norwegian politician
Ivar Aasen (1813–1896), Norwegian philologist, lexicographer and writer
John Aasen (1890–1938), American actor
Liv Aasen (1928–2005), Norwegian politician
Mats Zuccarello Aasen (born 1987), Norwegian  ice hockey player
Nils Waltersen Aasen (1878–1925), Norwegian arms inventor
Otto Aasen (1894–1983), Norwegian Nordic skier
Marianne Aasen (born 1967), Norwegian Labour politician

See also 
Ivar Aasen-sambandet, Norwegian philological organisation
Aas (surname)

Norwegian-language surnames